Hippotion aporodes is a moth of the family Sphingidae. It is known from forests from Ivory Coast to the Congo Basin and Uganda.

References

 Pinhey, E. (1962): Hawk Moths of Central and Southern Africa. Longmans Southern Africa, Cape Town.

Hippotion
Moths described in 1910
Moths of Africa